The 2017 Gazprom Hungarian Open was a men's tennis tournament played on outdoor clay courts. It was the 1st edition of the Hungarian Open as part of the ATP World Tour 250 series of the 2017 ATP World Tour. It took place at Nemzeti Edzés Központ in Budapest, Hungary, from April 24–30. The tournament replaced the Romanian Open on the ATP World Tour calendar.

Point distribution

Singles main-draw entrants

Seeds

1 Rankings are as of April 20, 2017

Other entrants
The following players received wildcards into the singles main draw:
  Fabio Fognini
  Márton Fucsovics

The following players received entry from the qualifying draw:
  Aljaž Bedene 
  Laslo Đere 
  Bjorn Fratangelo 
  Maximilian Marterer

The following player received entry as lucky losers:
  Marius Copil
  Evgeny Donskoy
  Sergiy Stakhovsky

Withdrawals
Before the tournament
  Federico Delbonis →replaced by  Marius Copil
  Alexandr Dolgopolov →replaced by  Damir Džumhur
  Marsel İlhan →replaced by  Evgeny Donskoy
  Adrian Mannarino →replaced by  Sergiy Stakhovsky

Doubles main-draw entrants

Seeds

1 Rankings were as of April 17, 2017

Other entrants
The following pairs received wildcards into the doubles main draw:
  Attila Balázs /  Gábor Borsos
  Marius Copil /  Márton Fucsovics

Champions

Singles 

  Lucas Pouille def.  Aljaž Bedene, 6–3, 6–1

Doubles 

  Brian Baker /  Nikola Mektić def.  Juan Sebastián Cabal /  Robert Farah, 7–6(7–2), 6–4

References

External links 
Official website

2017
2017 ATP World Tour
Hungarian Open